The Serie B 1935–36 was the seventh tournament of this competition played in Italy since its creation.

Teams
Siena and Taranto had been promoted from Prima Divisione, while Livorno and Pro Vercelli had been relegated from Serie A.

Events
Six teams were relegated in order to reduce the number of participants to sixteen.

Final classification

Results

Relegation play-off

Classification

Results
Played on neutral grounds:

Tie-breaker
Played in Lucca on July 5:

A.C. Pistoiese were relegated to Serie C.

References and sources
Almanacco Illustrato del Calcio - La Storia 1898-2004, Panini Edizioni, Modena, September 2005

1935-1936
2
Italy